Stjärnor på is is a celebrity ice skating show which was broadcast on TV4 in 2008. Carina Berg and Carolina Gynning presented the show.

References

TV4 (Sweden) original programming